Organ Pipe Peaks is a row of aiguille type rock peaks, 7 nautical miles (13 km) long, standing just north of Mount Harkness and east of Scott Glacier in the Gothic Mountains. Discovered by the geological party of the Byrd Antarctic Expedition, 1933–35, who gave the descriptive name.

Mountains of Marie Byrd Land